WABA League for the season 2016–17 was the sixteen season of the Adriatic League. Competition included ten teams from six countries. In this season participating clubs from Serbia, Montenegro, Bosnia and Herzegovina, Bulgaria, Slovenia and from Macedonia. WABA League for the season 2016–17 has begun to play October 2016. and ended in March 2017.

It was originally intended that in group A play Nikšić 1995 from Montenegro, but after giving up this team, in its place was moved from Group B team Play Off Happy in Bosnia and Herzegovina.

Team Play Off Sarajevo at the beginning of 2017 changed the general sponsor, and is the first part of the season appeared well Play Off Happy, and the other as Play Off Ultra.

Team information

Regular season
In the Regular season was played with 10 teams divided into 2 groups of 5 teams and play a dual circuit system, each with one game each at home and away. The four best teams in each group at the end of the regular season were placed in the League 8. The regular season began on 5 October 2016 and it will end on 11 January 2017.

Group A

Group B

League 8

In the League 8 was played with 8 teams and play a dual circuit system, each with one game each at home and away. The four best teams in League 8 at the end of the last round were placed on the Final Four. The regular season began on 18 January 2017 and it will end on 15 March 2017.

Classification 9–12
Classification 9–12 of the WABA League took place between 25 January 2017 and it will end on 9 February 2017. Due to the withdrawal of individual teams before the season starts, match for 11th place have been canceled. Before the start of matches to 9th place, Badel 1862 is withdrew from playing this stage of the competition.

Ninth place game

Final four

Final Four to be played from 18–19 March 2017 in the Podgorica, Montenegro.

Awards
Final Four MVP: Annamaria Prezelj (177-SG-97) of  Athlete Celje
Player of the Year: Monique Reid (185-PF-90) of  Beroe
Guard of the Year: Annamaria Prezelj (177-SG-97) of  Athlete Celje
Forward of the Year: Monique Reid (185-PF-90) of  Beroe
Center of the Year: Shante Evans (184-F/C-91) of  Athlete Celje
Defensive Player of the Year: Jazmine Perkins (178-G/F-89) of  Beroe
Most Improved Player of the Year: Nikolina Delić (184-SG-96) of  Play Off Ultra
Newcomer of the Year: Aleksandra Katanić (172-PG-97) of  Crvena zvezda
Coach of the Year: Damir Grgič of  Athlete Celje

1st Team
PG: Charel Allen (181-G-86) of  Montana 2003
SG: Annamaria Prezelj (177-SG-97) of  Athlete Celje
F: Monique Reid (185-PF-90) of  Beroe
PF: Kristina Topuzović (183-F/G-94) of  Budućnost Bemax
C: Shante Evans (184-F/C-91) of  Athlete Celje

2nd Team
PG: Božica Mujović (178-G-96) of  Budućnost Bemax
SG: Nikolina Delić (184-SG-96) of  Play Off Ultra
F: Irena Matović (186-F-88) of  Budućnost Bemax
F: Živa Zdolšek (178-F/G-89) of  Triglav Kranj
C: Ivanka Matić (193-C/F-79) of  Tarbes Basket

All-Defensive Team
G: Aleksandra Katanić (172-PG-97) of  Crvena zvezda
G: Jazmine Perkins (178-G/F-89) of  Beroe
F: Nikolina Delić (184-SG-96) of  Play Off Ultra
F: Monique Reid (185-PF-90) of  Beroe
C: Shante Evans (184-F/C-91) of  Athlete Celje

Honorable Mention
Iva Slonjšak (183-SG-97) of  Athlete Celje
Larisa Ocvirk (184-SF-97) of  Athlete Celje
Radostina Dimitrova (181-SF-94) of  Montana 2003
Suzana Milovanović (185-PF-79) of  Partizan 1953
Anđela Delić (184-G-96) of  Play Off Ultra

All-Newcomers Team
G: Aleksandra Krošelj (168-PG-99) of  Athlete Celje
G: Aleksandra Katanić (172-PG-97) of  Crvena zvezda
F: Snežana Bogićević (177-SG-97) of  Crvena zvezda
PF: Mina Đorđević (186-PF-99) of  Crvena zvezda
C: Nikolina Sofrić (186-F/C-00) of  Triglav Kranj

References

External links
 Official website
 2016–17 WABA League at eurobasket.com

 
2016-17
2016–17 in European women's basketball leagues
2016–17 in Serbian basketball
2016–17 in Bosnia and Herzegovina basketball
2016–17 in Montenegrin basketball
2016–17 in Slovenian basketball
2016–17 in Republic of Macedonia basketball
2016–17 in Bulgarian basketball